Nobody but Me is the ninth studio album by Canadian singer Michael Bublé. The album was released on October 21, 2016, by Reprise Records. It features three original songs co-written by Bublé, including the lead single "Nobody but Me", and nine cover versions.

Background
Bublé said of the album, "I don't know that I've ever had this much fun working on an album. It was especially thrilling to collaborate with my band who understand that I want to sound better than I've ever sounded. I'm also very proud of the new songs. Having the opportunity to co-produce was a joy for me personally."

The album features "Someday", a duet with Meghan Trainor, which was written by Trainor and Harry Styles of British boy band One Direction. It marks the first time Bublé has recorded an original song not written by himself.

Critical reception

Nobody but Me received mostly positive reviews from music critics. AllMusic's Matt Collar wrote: "not surprisingly, he keeps the dance going with his slick, superbly executed ninth studio album, 2016's Nobody but Me. Co-produced by Bublé along with a cadre of big-name pop producers including Johan Carlsson, Alan Chang, Jason "Spicy G" Goldman, and the Monsters & Strangerz, the album is not dissimilar from the Canadian artist's past works. Here, we get a handful of well-curated standards, from a jaunty reading of the Matt Monro classic "My Kind of Girl" to a lush, orchestral take on "The Very Thought of You" to a brightly swinging, Sinatra-esque version of "My Baby Just Cares for Me." And while it's Bublé's finely honed talent for delivering these urbane, time-tested songs that remains the foundation of his appeal, he continues to defy easy categorization with his various forays into newly penned, modern radio-ready pop. Cuts like the crisp, '50s rock-meets-2000s-hip-hop title track, the twangy and soulful "Today Is Yesterday's Tomorrow," and the ukulele-accented duet with Meghan Trainor "Someday," are peppy anthems that make the most of Bublé's charm. Ultimately, that Bublé can successfully transition on Nobody But Me from the uber-earnest acoustic guitar boy band romance of "I Believe in You" to the giddy, mandolin-soaked, Dean Martin-pastiche of "On an Evening in Roma (Sotter Celo de Roma)" and make both work is at the least an enviable skill and at best, a kind of pop magic. Very few of his contemporaries can do that and nobody but Bublé can own it like he does here.

Commercial performance
In Canada, Nobody but Me debuted at number three on the Canadian Albums Chart with 15,300 album-equivalent units. It is Bublé's sixth top three debut in the country. The following week, it ascended to number two. On December 7, 2016, Nobody but Me was certified Platinum by Music Canada for shipments of 80,000 copies in the country.

In the United States, Nobody but Me debuted at number 2 on the Billboard 200 with 91,000 units, 85,000 of which were pure album sales. The album sales dropped by 73% to 25,000 units in the second week; consequently it fell to number 10 on the Billboard 200.

In the United Kingdom, Nobody but Me debuted at number 2 on the UK Albums Chart with 55,087 sales. In its second week Nobody but Me dropped to number three with 25,350 sales. With his three-year-old son diagnosed with cancer, Bublé benefited from a boost to his sales given by his primetime special, Bublé at the BBC. On January 9, 2017, the album was certified Platinum by the British Phonographic Industry (BPI) for shipping 300,000 units in the country. According to the International Federation of the Phonographic Industry (IFPI), Nobody But Me was the 12th best-selling album of 2016, selling 1.2 million copies that year.

Track listing

Charts

Weekly charts

Year-end charts

Certifications and sales

!scope="row"|Worldwide (IFPI)
|
|1,200,000
|-

References

2016 albums
Albums produced by Johan Carlsson
Albums recorded at Capitol Studios
Albums recorded at Henson Recording Studios
Albums recorded at The Warehouse Studio
Juno Award for Adult Contemporary Album of the Year albums
Michael Bublé albums
Reprise Records albums